Until 1968 the Kleine Weser and the Werdersee were part of the river Weser in Bremen, Germany.

See also
List of rivers of Bremen

Rivers of Bremen (state)
0KleineWeser
Rivers of Germany